František Pitoňák (born 3 June 1973 in Rakúsy, Kežmarok District, Slovakia) is a Slovak male curler and curling coach.

As a coach of Slovak wheelchair curling team he participated in 2014 and 2018 Winter Paralympics.

Teams

Men's

Mixed

Mixed doubles

Record as a coach of national teams

Personal life
He is from big family of curlers: three of his brothers (Pavol, Tomáš and Peter) are František's teammates, they played together many times on European championships and other international curling tournaments; one more his brother Dušan played wheelchair curling (František coaches their wheelchair team on Worlds and Winter Paralympics); other family members also are curlers or coaches.

References

External links

Coach Profile - Frantisek PITONAK - World Para Nordic Skiing - Live results | International Paralympic Committee
Pitoňák František - Český svaz curlingu

 Video: 

Living people
1973 births
People from Kežmarok District
Sportspeople from the Prešov Region
Slovak male curlers
Slovak curling coaches